is a song recorded by Japanese singer songwriter Mai Kuraki. It was released as the second promotional single from her thirteenth studio album Unconditional Love, through Northern Music for digital download on 1 August 2021. The song was written in celebration of the tenth anniversary of the Sanrio character series, Wish me mell. This is the second time for Kuraki to write a song for the series, since the singer wrote "Stay the Same" in 2012.

Track listing

Charts

Release history

References

2021 songs
Mai Kuraki songs
Songs written by Mai Kuraki
Song recordings produced by Daiko Nagato